Justin Lewis may refer to:

 Justin Lewis (basketball) (born 2002), American basketball player
 Justin Lewis (cricketer) (born 1982), Zimbabwean cricketer
 Justin Lewis (media scholar), British media studies professor
 Justin Lewis (entrepreneur), software designer and entrepreneur
 Justin W. Lewis, American conductor, cellist and educator